The 1979 Virginia Tech Gobblers football team was an American football team that represented Virginia Tech as an independent during the 1979 NCAA Division I-A football season. In their second year under head coach Bill Dooley, the Gobblers compiled an overall record of 5–6.

Schedule

Players
The following players were members of the 1979 football team.

References

Virginia Tech
Virginia Tech Hokies football seasons
Virginia Tech Gobblers football